Malum prohibitum (plural mala prohibita, literal translation: "wrong [as or because] prohibited") is a Latin phrase used in law to refer to conduct that constitutes an unlawful act only by virtue of statute, as opposed to conduct that is evil in and of itself, or malum in se.

Conduct that is so clearly violative of society's standards for allowable conduct that it is illegal under English common law is usually regarded as malum in se. An offense that is malum prohibitum may not appear on the face to directly violate moral standards. The distinction between these two cases is discussed in State of Washington v. Thaddius X. Anderson:

Examples of offenses that are generally regarded as mala prohibita include disorderly conduct, gambling, possession of a controlled substance, prostitution, public intoxication, resisting arrest, speeding, and vagrancy.

See also

 Public-order crime
 Victimless crime

References

Criminal law
Latin legal terminology